The Rhytidoidea are a superfamily of air-breathing land snails and slugs, terrestrial gastropod mollusks in the suborder Helicina. 

The former taxonomy was based on the study by Nordsieck, published in 1986.

Taxonomy
Families within the superfamily Rhytidoidea are as follows:
 Acavidae Pilsbry, 1895
 Caryodidae Connolly, 1915
 Clavatoridae Thiele, 1926
 Dorcasiidae Connolly, 1915
 Macrocyclidae Thiele, 1926
 Megomphicidae H. B. Baker, 1930
 Rhytididae  Pilsbry, 1893 
 Strophocheilidae Pilsbry, 1902

References

 Bouchet P., Rocroi J.P., Hausdorf B., Kaim A., Kano Y., Nützel A., Parkhaev P., Schrödl M. & Strong E.E. (2017). Revised classification, nomenclator and typification of gastropod and monoplacophoran families. Malacologia. 61(1-2): 1-526

Stylommatophora